"I Want Your Love" is a song by Atomic Kitten, released as the third single from their debut album, Right Now (2000). The song samples the theme to the 1958 film The Big Country, and it was produced, arranged, recorded, and mixed by Damien Mendis at Metropolis Studios in London. 

Released on 3 July 2000, "I Want Your Love" peaked at number 10 on the UK Singles Chart and number 48 in Ireland. Initial copies of the singles also contained a sample of the KLF's 1991 hit single "Justified & Ancient", but later copies had the sample removed. In 2004, "I Want Your Love" was included on Atomic Kitten's The Greatest Hits compilation.

Music video
The video for the song was inspired by David Bowie's debut hit "Space Oddity". It opens with the doors opening in three rooms on a planet (red, yellow, and blue). Natasha Hamilton is in a red room on a bed, Liz McClarnon is in a blue room lying on the blue wall and Kerry Katona is in a yellow room sitting by a soft teddy bear. Shots in chorus one has three women dancing on a planet on a circle in the middle. During the bridge section, the Kittens are in the middle of a circle on a planet with three men, and they make a sound effect by moving their arms. In the bridge and the final chorus, the three girls and other dancers dance on a big circle on a planet. An alternate version of the music video shows clips from the 2000 film Titan A.E..

Track listings
UK CD1
 "I Want Your Love" (2XS radio mix) – 3:15
 "I Want Your Love" (Q's Detonator alternative radio mix) – 3:30
 "I Want Your Love" (video) – 3:36

UK CD2
 "I Want Your Love" (2XS radio mix) – 3:15
 "I Want Your Love" (Sleaze Sisters Anthem mix) – 7:08
 "I Want Your Love" (Ricochet's Monolith mix) – 9:29

UK cassette single
A1. "I Want Your Love" (2XS radio mix) – 3:15
A2. "I Want Your Love" (Maximum Q Atom Bomb mix) – 6:14
B1. "I Want Your Love" (Q's Detonator alternative radio mix) – 3:30
B2. "I Want Your Love" (Frankie Constantinou disco mix) – 6:55

Credits and personnel
Credits are lifted from the UK CD1 liner notes and the Right Now liner notes.

Studios
 Recorded at Motor Museum Studios (Liverpool, England)
 Mixed at Studio One (United Kingdom)

Personnel

 Stuart Kershaw – writing
 Andy McCluskey – writing
 Liz McClarnon – writing
 Bill Drummond – writing
 Jimmy Cauty – writing
 Ricardo Lyte – writing
 Jerome Moross – writing
 Atomic Kitten – vocals
 Rita Campbell – backing vocals

 2XS – all instruments, mixing
 Damien Mendis – radio mix production, vocal production
 Stuart Bradbury – radio mix production, vocal production, vocal engineering, recording and mix engineering
 Engine – radio mix vocal production, Q's Detonator production
 Pete Craigie – radio mix vocal engineering, Q's Detonator engineering
 Pat O'Shaughnessy – radio mix vocal engineering, Q's Detonator engineering
 Ricochet – Q's Detonator additional production and remix

Charts

References

2000 singles
2000 songs
Atomic Kitten songs
Innocent Records singles
Songs written by Andy McCluskey
Songs written by Liz McClarnon
Songs written by Stuart Kershaw
Virgin Records singles